Afienya is a community near Tema in the Greater Accra Region of Ghana. The Dortsedor River is located along the Afienya-Dawhenya road.

Facilities 

 Afienya Gliding School
 Melcom

Notable native 

 Lord Morgan (musician)

References 

Greater Accra Region
Communities in Ghana